"Juste une p'tite chanson" is a song by Les Enfoirés released in 2017. The song has peaked at number eight on the French Singles Chart.

Charts

References

2017 singles
2017 songs
French-language songs
Songs written by Grégoire (musician)